Sidharth Sripad Kuncalienker is a former member of Goa Legislative Assembly. He has been elected in a by poll from Panaji constituency in place of Manohar Parrikar. He belongs to the Bharatiya Janata Party (BJP). On 10 May 2017, Kuncalienker resigned in order to allow Goa Chief Minister Manohar Parrikar to contest the seat.

Posts
He was the chairman of the Economic Development Corporation limited.

References

Living people
Year of birth missing (living people)
Goa MLAs 2012–2017
Goa MLAs 2017–2022
Bharatiya Janata Party politicians from Goa
People from Panaji